"And now I will show you, where they were preparing the attack on Belarus from" is a phrase widely spread on russophone internet communities said by Alexander Lukashenko, which attempts to justify Russia's invasion of Ukraine in regards to Belarus. The phrase subsequently became very popular in many countries of the former Soviet Union and started being used as a meme in various videos from mid-March 2022.

History
In the memes, Lukashenko was cut out of the original video and, along with the soundtrack, is transferred into different films and funny situations. The basis of the memes was a video filmed at the talks between the presidents of Russia and Belarus, which took place on March 11, 2022. At this meeting, Alexander Lukashenko assured Vladimir Putin that if the "special operation" had not begun, then Ukraine would have attacked Belarus first:

According to the BBC: "His zeal in justifying Russia's aggression against Ukraine was rewarded with a set of wacky Internet memes." Among other examples, adaptations of the video showed Lukashenko at a rail-station, sat down near a garbage can, in a yard with elderly ladies, telling his monologue to the ballerinas of the Swan Lake, the heroes of the films The Shining and Ivan Vasilievich Changes Profession, a girl riding fairground rides, porn actresses, Yelena Malysheva on the program Live healthy!,<ref name="tvk6">{{Cite web |title=«А я сейчас покажу, откуда на Беларусь готовилось нападение»: как речь Лукашенко стала мемом |url=https://www.tvk6.ru/publications/news/65957/ |access-date=2022-04-11 |website=www.tvk6.ru |language=ru |archive-date=2022-04-12 |archive-url=https://web.archive.org/web/20220412074610/https://www.tvk6.ru/publications/news/65957/ |url-status=live }}</ref> the host of the talk show Let's Get Married Larisa Guzeeva, alien company, Mr. Bean, chickens, homeless people at a train station, Oscar viewers, and broadcasts from Vladimir Zhirinovsky's coffin to Putin.

In addition, "videos with an unexpected ending" are being created, where after the intrigue is dragged out, Lukashenko's monologue becomes a catharsis. For example, in a video about what to do if a handsome guy pays attention to you: "Turn away, look down, smile, say: "I'll show you now ...", or what to do with your girlfriend alone in a vehicle where he the same result. Lukashenko is also ridiculed by celebrities, such as Yegor Grigoryevich Krutogolov from the Diesel Show'', who combined the speech of the "father" and the explosion of a warehouse in Belgorod.

The catchphrase began to be used in the media in other situations with Lukashenko, for example, when he received a blow to the face during a hockey match: "Now I'll show you where the blow to the chin came from...".

On April 24, Lukashenko said that Polish, Lithuanian and Latvian were standing near the Belarusian border, asking to cross the border to buy buckwheat and salt. In response, Edgars Rinkēvičs, the Minister of Latvian Foreign Affairs, tweeted: "And now I will show you  where they come to Belarus for buckwheat and salt".

On April 27, several Belarusian students were detained for this popular meme on TikTok.

See also
 Ghost of Kyiv
 Where have you been for eight years?

References 

2022 in Belarus
Internet memes related to the 2022 Russian invasion of Ukraine
Alexander Lukashenko
Vladimir Putin
Belarus in the 2022 Russian invasion of Ukraine
Viral videos
March 2022 events in Russia
Internet in Belarus
Belarus in the Russo-Ukrainian War